Stephen Thomas Curry (born September 13, 1965) is an American former starting pitcher in Major League Baseball who played briefly for the Boston Red Sox during the  season. Listed at 6' 6", 217 lb., he batted and threw right-handed.

In three starts, Curry posted a 0–1 record with four strikeouts and a 8.18 ERA in 11.0 innings pitched.

External links

1965 births
Living people
Baseball players from Florida
Major League Baseball pitchers
Boston Red Sox players
SCF Manatees baseball players
Oklahoma City 89ers players
St. Paul Saints players

State College of Florida, Manatee–Sarasota alumni
American expatriate baseball players in Mexico
American expatriate baseball players in Taiwan
Elmira Pioneers players
Gulf Coast Red Sox players
Memphis Chicks players
Mercuries Tigers players
New Britain Red Sox players
Omaha Royals players
Pawtucket Red Sox players
Piratas de Campeche players
Winter Haven Red Sox players
Plantation High School alumni